Nayan Desai (born 22 February 1946) is a Gujarati language poet from Gujarat, India. His significant work includes Manas Urfe Reti Urfe Dariyo (1979), Mukam Post Manas (1983), and Dhoop Ka Saya (ghazals in Urdu). He received the Kalapi Award in 2013 and the Kavishwar Dalpatram Award in 2016.

Biography 
Desai was born on 22 February 1946 in Kathodara, a town now in the Surat district, to Harshadray and Indumatiben. His family belonged to Valod. After completing his SSC in 1965, he worked in a diamond factory for 14 years. In 1980, he joined Gujarat Mitra, a Gujarati daily, as a sub-editor. He has retired.

He married Shashi in 1990.

Works 
His first poetry collection Manas Urfe Reti Urfe Dariyo (1979) has 58 poems which are mostly ghazals and some are songs. His second collection Mukam Post Manas (1982) has 56 poems. These two collections are experimental and include variety. These poems depict loneliness and separation of modern humans. A person affected and tormented by pain is a central theme of his poetry. He later published Angali Vadhine Mokalu (1984), Anushthan and Samandar Baj Manas. All these collections were collected and published as Nayan na Moti (2005). Dhoop Ka Saya has ghazals in Urdu.

Recognition 
His Mukam Post Manas (1982) was awarded by the Gujarati Sahitya Parishad and his Dhoop Ka Saya was awarded by the Urdu Sahitya Akademi. The Indian National Theatre awarded him the Kalapi Award in 2013 for his significant contribution to Gujarati ghazal poetry. He received the Kavishwar Dalpatram Award in 2016 for his contribution to Gujarati poetry.

See also
 List of Gujarati-language writers

References

External links 
 

Modernist poets
1946 births
Living people
Gujarati-language poets
People from Surat district
Indian male poets
Poets from Gujarat
20th-century Indian poets
20th-century Indian male writers
Urdu-language poets from India
Indian editors